The Bayer designation Epsilon Arae (ε Ara / ε Arae) is shared by two star systems, in the constellation Ara:
 ε1 Arae
 ε2 Arae
They are separated by 0.54° on the sky.

Arae, Epsilon
Ara (constellation)